Talwinder Singh (born 1 January 1994) is an Indian field hockey player who plays as a forward.

References

External links
Player profile at Hockey India

1994 births
Living people
Field hockey players from Jalandhar
Indian male field hockey players
Delhi Waveriders players
Hockey India League players